Castelliri is a comune (municipality) of c. 3,500 inhabitants in the province of Frosinone in the Italian region Lazio, located in the valley of the Liri, about  southeast of Rome and about  northeast of Frosinone.

Castelliri borders the following municipalities: Arpino, Isola del Liri, Monte San Giovanni Campano, Sora.

References

External links
 Official website

Cities and towns in Lazio